Legal High or リーガル・ハイ is a legal drama and comedy Japanese TV drama series that was broadcast on Fuji TV series from 2012. Written by Ryota Furusawa and directed by Junichi Ishikawa. Legal High is a comedy touch on a courtroom drama of two foil character, Kensuke Komikado(Masato Sakai) a shrewd lawyer who has never lost in a lawsuit, and a new lawyer with a strong sense of Justice, Machiko Mayuzumi(Yui Aragaki). Legal High also stars Kotaro Satomi, Junnosuke Taguchi, Eiko Koike, Katsuhisa Namase, Masaki Okada, Haru Kuroki, Ryōko Hirosue, and Masato Yano.

Series overview 
<onlyinclude>

Episodes

Season 1

Season 2

Special episodes

References

Legal High